Cicciput is a 2003 studio album by Italian rock band Elio e le Storie Tese.

In 2003, Elio e le Storie Tese won the Best Italian Videoclip award at the Italian Music Awards of Federation of the Italian Music Industry for the videoclip of the song "Shpalman®", included in Cicciput.

Cicciput has been certified gold in Italy.

Track listing
 "Cicciput" – 0:47 
 "Budy Giampi" – 4:58
 "Gimmi I." – 4:21
 "Fossi figo" – 5:24
 "Cani e padroni di cani" – 4:35
 "La follia della donna (Parte I)" – 3:21
 "Shpalman®" – 5:08
 "La chanson" – 5:25
 "Pagàno" – 5:30
 "Abate cruento" – 5:54
 "Pilipino Rock" – 3:36
 "Litfiba tornate insieme" – 4:07
 "Pagàno karaoke" (ghost track) – 7:19

Personnel
Elio - lead vocals, flute, acoustic guitar
Rocco Tanica - keyboards
Cesareo - electric guitar
Faso - bass guitar
Christian Meyer - drums
Jantoman (Uomo) - electronic keyboards

Charts

References

Further reading

External links

2003 albums
Elio e le Storie Tese albums
Italian-language albums